Rendez-vous avec Maurice Chevalier n°1 is a French short film directed by Maurice Régamey in 1957.

Synopsis 
Maurice Chevalier visits several artists to discuss their work.

Songs

References

External links 

1957 films
1957 short films
French black-and-white films
French short films
Maurice Chevalier
1950s French films